Kennonsburg is an unincorporated community in Noble County, in the U.S. state of Ohio.

History
Kennonsburg was founded in 1846. A post office was established at Kennonsburg in 1849, and remained in operation until 1905.

References

Unincorporated communities in Noble County, Ohio
Unincorporated communities in Ohio